The 1902 Challenge Cup was the 6th staging of rugby league's oldest knockout competition, the Challenge Cup. It featured clubs from England's 1901-02 Northern Rugby Football Union season.

First round

Second round

Third round

Quarterfinals

Semifinals

Final
The final was contested by the Broughton Rangers and Salford at the Athletic Grounds in Rochdale.

The final was played on Saturday 26 April 1902, where Broughton beat Salford 25–0 at Rochdale in front of a crowd of 15,006.

References

External links
Challenge Cup official website 
Challenge Cup 1901/02 results at Rugby League Project

Challenge Cup
Challenge Cup